The City of Bradford Metropolitan District Council elections were held on Thursday, 7 May 1998, with one third of the council up for election. Since the previous election there had been a number of by-elections resulting in two Labour defenses and a Conservative gain in Heaton, due to be defended at this election. Labour retained control of the council.

Election result

This result had the following consequences for the total number of seats on the council after the elections:

Ward results

By-elections between 1998 and 1999

References

1998 English local elections
1998
1990s in West Yorkshire